Orn and Örn is an Icelandic name. 

It may refer to:

People with the given name

Örn Arnarson (born 1981), Icelandic swimmer 
Örn Árnason (born 1959), Icelandic actor, comedian and screenwriter
Örn Clausen (1928–2008), Icelandic decathlete

People with the surname
Adam Örn Arnarson (born 1995), Icelandic football defender
Ásgeir Örn Hallgrímsson (born 1984), Icelandic handball player
Áskell Örn Kárason (born 1953), Icelandic chess champion
Birgir Örn Birgisson (born 1969), Icelandic basketball coach and a former player 
Einar Örn Benediktsson (born 1962), Icelandic singer, trumpet player and politician
Einar Örn Jónsson (born 1976), Icelandic handball player 
Eiríkur Örn Norðdahl (born 1978), Icelandic writer
Gudmundur Orn Gudjonsson (born 1982), Icelandic compound archer
Gunnar Örn Jónsson (born 1985), Icelandic football player
Gunnar Örn Tynes (born 1979), Icelandic musician 
Hilmar Örn Hilmarsson (born 1958), Icelandic musician and art director
Hólmar Örn Eyjólfsson (born 1990), Icelandic football player
Hólmar Örn Rúnarsson (born 1981), Icelandic football player
Jón Örn Loðmfjörð (born 1983), Icelandic experimental poet
Kristján Örn Sigurðsson (born 1980), Icelandic football player
Markús Örn Antonsson (born 1943), Mayor of Reykjavík 
Ólafur Örn Bjarnason (born 1975), Icelandic football defender
Óskar Örn Hauksson (born 1984), Icelandic football player
Mikael Örn (born 1961), Swedish swimmer
Rolf Örn (1893–1979), Swedish Olympic equestrian
Stefan Örn (born 1975), Swedish music composer and guitarist
Viðar Örn Kjartansson (born 1990), Icelandic football player

Surnames from nicknames